Phillip Holmes may refer to:

Phillips Holmes (1907–1942), American actor
Philip Holmes (born 1945), American engineering professor